Rovasenda railway station is one of two train stations, serving the comune of Rovasenda (situated in the valley part of hill), in the Piedmont region, northwestern Italy. It is the junction of the Biella–Novara. It also plays a role interchange with station Rovasenda Alta of line Santhià–Arona.

The station is currently managed by Rete Ferroviaria Italiana (RFI). Train services are operated by Trenitalia.  Each of these companies is a subsidiary of Ferrovie dello Stato (FS), Italy's state-owned rail company.

History
The station was opened along with the rest of the line from 18 May 1939, becoming however operation only since 20 July 1940 because of the need to complete several systems and the absence of the rolling stock.

Because of the altitude, it was not possible to rejoin the new line with the existing station. It was therefore built a new station more valley and an intermediate square for put into communication the two lines.

From 21 January 1961, in advance to the end of the concession to the "Società Ferrovia Biella-Novara (SFBN)" company, the management of the railway line passed to the state and the exercise of the stations was assumed by Ferrovie dello Stato.

In the year 2000, the plant management passed to Rete Ferroviaria Italiana, which is classified in the category "Bronze".

Features
Two tracks of which are equipped with platforms.

Train services
The station is served by the following service(s):

Regional services (Treno regionale) Biella San Paolo - Novara

See also

 History of rail transport in Italy
 List of railway stations in Piedmont
 Rail transport in Italy
 Railway stations in Italy

References

External links

Rovasenda
Railway stations in Piedmont
Railway stations opened in 1939